Peter Shevlin (1902–1948) was a Scottish footballer who played as a goalkeeper.

He is mainly remembered for his time with Celtic, joining the club from the Junior grade in Glasgow. He had a relatively short period as their first choice goalkeeper, in between the spells of Charlie Shaw and John Thomson. He did take part in winning the Scottish Cup in 1925, the Scottish Football League in 1925–26 and the Glasgow Cup in 1926–27 (having played in the team that lost in the finals of both that competition and the Scottish Cup in the previous year).

He later played for South Shields and Nelson in England, was player-manager of Shelbourne in Ireland, then returned to Scotland with Hamilton Academical (where injury cost him a place in the 1935 Scottish Cup Final) and Albion Rovers.

References

External links
article

Association football goalkeepers
Celtic F.C. players
Hamilton Academical F.C. players
Albion Rovers F.C. players
Nelson F.C. players
St Roch's F.C. players
Pollok F.C. players
Scottish Junior Football Association players
1902 births
1948 deaths
Scottish footballers
Scottish football managers
Association football player-managers
Shelbourne F.C. players
Shelbourne F.C. managers
League of Ireland players
League of Ireland managers
Footballers from Hamilton, South Lanarkshire
Scottish Football League players
English Football League players
South Shields F.C. (1889) players
Scottish expatriate footballers
Expatriate association footballers in the Republic of Ireland
Scottish expatriate sportspeople in Ireland